Now and Zen is the fourth solo album by Robert Plant, released 29 February 1988 by Es Paranza Records, Plant's own label. The album made the top 10 in the US (No. 6) and UK (No. 10). It was certified triple platinum by the RIAA on 7 September 2001. The album was produced by Tim Palmer, Robert Plant, and Phil Johnstone.

Background and recording
With a new band and a new perspective on his music, Plant returned in late 1987 with more of the sound that had previously defined him in Led Zeppelin. Although Plant continued to utilize computerized audio technology in a similar fashion to his previous solo albums, for this album Plant integrated the blues that had all but been abandoned on his most recent album Shaken 'n' Stirred (1985). A prominent guitar sound and an exotic feel to the recordings also marked another change in direction for the artist, who now added Middle Eastern tones in songs like "Heaven Knows". This is a direction that he would eventually follow in the 1990s with Page and Plant.

The tracks "Heaven Knows" and "Tall Cool One" feature Led Zeppelin guitarist Jimmy Page. (On the liner notes, Page's participation on the songs is noted with a Zoso symbol.) In response to the Beastie Boys' unauthorized sampling of some Led Zeppelin songs on their 1986 album Licensed to Ill, Plant also used samples from Led Zeppelin songs ("Whole Lotta Love", "Dazed and Confused", "Black Dog", "Custard Pie", and "The Ocean") on "Tall Cool One", additionally singing words from "When the Levee Breaks".

Release and reception 

The original released copies of the CD and Album version contained a wolf motif mini-flag in satin red. This is a tribute to his favorite association football team, the  Wolverhampton Wanderers (Wolves by fans). This mini-flag is also a rare collector's item. "Walking Towards Paradise" was originally as a bonus track available only on CD versions of the album and as the B-side of the single "Heaven Knows". Rhino Entertainment released a remastered edition of the album, with bonus tracks, on 3 April 2007.

Now and Zen was received positively by both Plant's fans and professional music critics. In a contemporary review for Rolling Stone, Kurt Loder hailed Now and Zen as "some kind of stylistic event: a seamless pop fusion of hard guitar rock, gorgeous computerization and sharp, startling songcraft." Robert Christgau found it superior to his previous two attractive but forgettable solo albums, writing in The Village Voice that "at its best, it's far from forgettable. Overall effect is a cross between his former band and the Cars."

In an interview he gave to Uncut magazine in 2005, Plant commented that "by the time Now and Zen came out in '88, it looked like I was big again. It was a Top 10 album on both sides of the Atlantic. But if I listen to it now, I can hear that a lot of the songs got lost in the technology of the time."

Track listing

Appearances in other media
Plant performed "Ship of Fools", "Tall Cool One" and "Heaven Knows" at the Atlantic Records 40th Anniversary concert in 1988.
"Ship of Fools" was also featured on the final two-hour episode of Miami Vice, "Freefall". It is the musical accompaniment to Crockett and Tubbs return to Miami via motor yacht after rescuing General Bourbon (a thinly veiled Manuel Noriega-type character) from the fictional Central American nation of Costa Morada.

Personnel 
Musicians
 Robert Plant – vocals
 Doug Boyle – guitars
 Phil Scragg – bass
 Phil Johnstone – keyboards, programming
 Chris Blackwell – drums and percussion

Additional musicians
 Jimmy Page – guitar solos on "Heaven Knows" and "Tall Cool One"
 Marie Pierre, Kirsty MacColl, Toni Halliday – backing vocals
 Robert Crash, David Barratt – programming
Charlie Jones - bass on bonus tracks 11-13
 Jerry Wayne - voice-over on "White, Clean And Neat"

Production
 Tim Palmer – producer
 Rob Bozas, Martin Russell, Dave Barrett, Michael Gregovich, Tim Burrell, Jonathan Dee – engineers
 Richard Evans – design and art direction
 Davies and Starr – photography

Charts

References 

1988 albums
Robert Plant albums
Albums produced by Tim Palmer